is a Japanese medical drama that premiered in October 2012 on TV Asahi. It stars Japanese actress Ryōko Yonekura.

Plot 
The show follows Daimon Michiko, a freelance surgeon who works at university hospitals in Japan. Also known as Doctor-X, Daimon is introduced at new hospitals by walking into surgery staff planning review sessions, where the conditions of her work are established. She is depicted as challenging a medical system in crisis, which follows the laws of the jungle.

Her trademark line is "I never fail", and she is willing to do high risk surgeries that other surgeons are not, sending those patients elsewhere when they are deemed non-operable.  Her success in treating high risk patients is a result of always putting the patient first, prioritizing their health above performing medical firsts or innovative techniques, and to adapt the right surgical methods on the spot when needed. This practice often puts her into conflict with other doctors. Beyond being a surgeon, she also served as a vet, combat surgeon and resort doctor. Daimon is supported by her manager Akira Kanbara and anesthesiologist Hiromi Jōnouchi.

First season 
Daimon Michiko, a lone wolf freelance surgeon who hates authority and groups, joins Teito III University Hospital, where her way of practicing results in conflict with hospital administrators.

Second season 
Daimon continues her practice of doing risky surgeries to benefit patients.  This practice continues to create conflict with hospital administrators.

Third season 
The Hospital" and the West's "Seikyo University Hospital". is brought in to try to minimize these conflicts and bring a more patient-focused approach.

Fourth season 
Daimon returns in the fourth season to the Totei University Hospital.  Shigekatsu Hiruma serves as the primary adversary for Daimon.

Fifth season 
Daimon returns to Totei University Hospital to assist in bringing a more patient-driven approach.  Her main antagonist is the Japan Doctor's Club chairman.

Sixth season
Daimon clashes with Totei University Hospital's new administrator Nicholas Tange, (a 2nd generation Japanese-Brazilian, aka "The Vulture"), whose aggressive cost-cutting threatens the integrity of the hospital.

Seventh season
Coming back from New Zealand, Dr. Daimon returns to Tōtei university hospital amidst the COVID-19 pandemic. The internal medicine department is now a priority over surgery with Dr. Hachisuka leading it.

Cast
The show stars Ryōko Yonekura as Doctor-X – Daimon Michiko.  Yonekura was a former fashion model who had performed as the first Roxie Hart in the Japanese theater production of Chicago in 2008.  After learning English, Yonekura made her Broadway debut in the same role in 2012 and reprised it in 2017.  The actress has said that she overuses her character's catchphrase, “私、失敗しないので" (“I never fail") in her personal life.  Yonekura also sees the character as a lighter, less stressed and more free reflection of herself.

Shirō Itō and Ittoku Kishibe were both veteran actors who joined the cast for the first season.

Yuki Uchida appears in all 7 seasons playing Jonouchi Hiromi, an anesthesiologist who works for the same agency as Michiko Daimon.

Ryōko Yonekura, Takeshi Kitano and Kei Inoo all appeared in the special. Takeshi Kitano returned to acting after a two-year absence for his role in the special. He had taken time off to work behind the camera. Michiko Tanaka was also a regular in the fourth season, playing the secretary of the hospital director.  Tanaka was nervous during the whole three months of filming for the season because she had to work with  Toshiyuki Nishida.

The fourth season also starred Toshiyuki Nishida as Shigekatsu Hiruma. He had previously appeared in Nobunaga Concerto and State of Union.

Yonekura returned for the fourth season despite an earlier intention not to do so.  During the break between seasons, Yonekura had starred in the Broadway production of Chicago. The actress and former model gave as her reason for previously declining to appear in the fourth season that she had not had an opportunity to star in the same TV series for an extended run and she never had the confidence to respond to people’s expectations. However, because it was a role she really liked, and she felt able to reprise the role. Traditionally, dramas run for only one season in Japan.

Masao Kusakari stars in the fifth season.

Main cast 

 Ryoko Yonekura as Michiko Daimon (Doctor-X) 
A freelance surgeon who takes on the most difficult operations using unorthodox and dangerous methods. Her favorite catchphrase is "I never fail". 
 Ittoku Kishibe as Akira Kanbara (Melon-Ojisan) 
The owner of Kanbara Medical Referral Agency and a former surgeon. Also another Doctor-X who was stripped of his medical License in Cuba. Known for his exorbitant prices and giving melons as gifts, given the nickname of Melon-Ojisan by Hiruma Shigekatsu.
 Yuki Uchida as Hiromi Jonouchi 
A anaesthetist who originally worked Full-Time in Season One. Resigned in the final episode and joined Kanbara Medical Referral Agency. She is a single mother, her husband is also a doctor who appeared in the series.

 Masanobu Katsumura as Hideki Kaji
One of the surgeons working for the University Hospital. He is known for his expertise in laparoscopy. Dr. Kaji calls Dr. Daimon as "demon" due to how she doesn't follow status quo. This character is the only one with a spin-off in the series "Doctor-Y".
 Kosuke Suzuki as Mamoru Hara
One of three recurring surgeons working for the University. Dr. Daimon calls him "Kin-chan". 
 Kenichi Endo as Takashi Ebina
One of the surgeons of Tōtei University Hospital, he is portrayed as someone weak to authority. He tries to be on Director Hiruma's good side by following his orders.
 Toshiyuki Nishida as Shigekatsu Hiruma
One of the main antagonists of the series. In the series, he has been promoted, demoted, holding the position of hospital director or head of surgery. He tries to gain power by controlling top staff, taking advantage of Michiko's assignments, or through corrupt means.

Secondary Cast 

 Kei Tanaka as Morimoto Hikaru
Appearances: Season 1 and Season 5 - A surgeon who left at the end of Season One to hone his skills overseas. In the premiere of Season 5, he returned to work in a rural area, but was transferred back to the main hospital by Shimura Madoka. In season 7 he returns briefly to Tōtei but now as a medical "Extuber" helping to provide good publicity.

 Shiro Ito as Busujima Ryunosuke
Appearances: Season 1, 2 and 3 - The Director of the Hospital in Season One until he was fired due to underhand tactics by Hiruma Shigekatsu. In Season Two, he re-appeared to help Daimon Michiko in fulfilling her wish to operate on a patient. In Season Three, he appeared in the premiere and was rescued from an explosion on a cruise by Daimon.

 Mansai Nomura as Hachisuka Ryutaro

Appearances: Season 7 - A former surgeon now practicing internal medicine.

Guest appearances

Season one 

 Mansaku Fuwa as Jiro Ichinose, the president of Ichinose rubber company (Episode 1)
 Miyako Yamaguchi as Namiko Ichinose, Jiro's wife (Episode 1)
 Raita Ryū as Shigeru Kubo, Totei University Hospital director (Episode 1)
 Hirofumi Arai as Satoru Yasuda (Episode 2)
 Midoriko Kimura as Mitsuyo Yasuda, Satoru's wife (Episode 2)
 Kazuaki Hankai as Noboru Nikaidō, the president of Nikaidō Publishing company (Episode 2)
 Kami Hiraiwa as Mitsue Hanayama, a food blogger (Episode 3)
 Shinsō Nakamaru as Tadashi Honda, Mitsue's lawyer (Episode 3)
 Shingo Tsurumi as Atsushi Yotsuya, a foreign fund manager (Episode 4)
 Tamao Akae as Mariko Yoshinaga, The Super Doctors program's host (Episode 4)
 Akari Ninomiya as Saki Gokita (Episode 5)
 Naomasa Musaka as Motohiko Rokusaka (Episode 6)
 Kayoko Kishimoto as Nanako Torii, Takashi Torii's wife (Episode 7–8)
 Koji Yamamoto as Takuya Hijikata (Episode 7–8)
 Kanji Tsuda as Ryo Yagi, a gossip magazine black journalist (Episode 8)

Season two 

 Minori Terada as Kin'ya Ninomiya, the president of Ninomiya Real Estate company (Episode 2)
 Mirai Yamamoto as Torako Mimura (Episode 3)
 Mayumi Myosei as Mika Kanie (Episode 3)
 Yumiko Shaku as Rumiko Shijō, the owner of Nakazono hostess bar in Ginza (Episode 4)
 Hiroshi Ookochi as Ichirō Gomi (Episode 5)
 Fuka Koshiba as Kaori Gomi, Ichiro's daughter (Episode 5)
 Tetsuya Bessho as Mitsuhiko Kusakabe (Episode 5)
 Shigeru Izumiya as Rokusuke Kondo, Shinobu's father (Episode 6)
 Yumi Shirakawa as Hisae Asai, a Health Policy Bureau of Ministry of Health, Labour and Welfare (Episode 7)
 Miyu Honda as Kurumi Murata (Episode 8–9)
 Kaoru Okunuki as Mitsuyo Murata, Kurumi's mother (Episode 8–9)
 Kenichi Kobayashi as Yasaku Takemoto, a fisherman (Episode 8)

Season three 

 Naoko Otani as Haruko Busujima, Ryonosuke Busujima's wife (Episode 1)
 Romeo Thomas as Bob First, a cruise crew's son (Episode 1)
 Akira Nakao as Tetsuya Kurobe, the director of National Advance Medical Center (Episode 1)
 Moto Fuyuki as Jirō Tsukiji, a restaurant owner (Episode 1–2)
 Naoki Matayoshi as Shōji Kazama (Episode 2)
 Seita Hosokawa as Kazuya Tsukiji, Jirō's son (Episode 2)
 Shima Iwashita as Masae Mihara, the chief of Japan Nurses Federation (Episode 3)
 Ayaka Morita as Nanako Mihara, Masae's granddaughter (Episode 3)
 Takashi Matsuo as Hiroshi Yomo, a freelance journalist (Episode 4)
 Walter Roberts as Albert Savarotti (Episode 4)
 Seiichirō Uchida as Keiichirō Iiyama, the program host (Episode 4)
 Jun Inoue as Shingo Tanaka (Episode 5)
 Hiroto Yoshimitsu as Hirohisa Igarashi (Episode 5)
 Noboru Kaneko as Takashi Rokko, an IT company director and Hiromi Jonouchi's high school classmate (Episode 6)
 Kyūsaku Shimada as Tatsuya Ichikawa, a Tokyo district prosecutor (Episode 6)
 Mikito Nakawaki as Masakazu Uehara, a Tokyo district prosecutor (Episode 6)
 Kei Sunaga as Takehiro Ōizumi, the Minister of Health, Labour and Welfare (Episode 6)
 Ginpunchō as Nanami Kotozuka (Episode 7)
 Yukiko Takabayashi as Shizuko Suita (Episode 7)
 Seiran Kobayashi as Chihiro Yada (Episode 8)
 Keiko Horiuchi as Kasumi Yada, Chihiro's mother (Episode 8)
 Kazutaka Ishii as Kunio Yada, Chihiro's father (Episode 8)
 Nanao as Maya Kokonoe, a model (Episode 9)
 Judy Ongg as Yoshiko Tokachi, a Diet member (Episode 9–11)
 Kazuyo Aoki as the owner of a hot spring (Episode 11)
 Takeo Nakahara as Minoru Hanyū, a Chief Cabinet Secretary (Episode 11)

Special 

 Kei Inoo (Hey! Say! JUMP) as Kojirō Himuro, a figure skating champion
 Munetaka Aoki as Gen Akagi
 Manami Hashimoto as Harumi Kanazawa
 Shōken Kunimoto as a stall owner
 Kaito Takamura as Sōta Aoki, Gen's son

Season four 

 Daichi Watanabe as Jun Ichiki, an IT company director (Episode 1)
 Kei Yamamoto as Hideo Nioka, a village chief of Nijikawa, Yamagata (Episode 2)
 Yuriko Hoshi as Chiyoko Nioka, Hideo's wife (Episode 2)
 Hiro Otaka as Ozaki, a village chief assistant (Episode 2)
 Tokuma Nishioka as Yōji Kanemoto (Episode 2)
 Kōichirō Sakai as Kanemoto's secretary (Episode 2)
 Tamaki Shirai as Hideo's secret daughter (Episode 2)
 Yuki Matsushita as Misae Suyama, Saionji's former girlfriend and a former hostess (Episode 3)
 Saki Takaoka as Mirei Yotsuba, one of the Yotsuba sisters beauty unit (Episode 4)
 Kinako Kobayashi as Mion Yotsuba, one of the Yotsuba sisters beauty unit (Episode 4)
 Yūichi Tsuchiya as Tetsuo Goto, a single father patient who had a metal allergy (Episode 5)
 Ayumu Yokoyama as Shōta Goto, Tetsuo's son (Episode 5)
 Ian Moore as John Starkey, a professor at Boston University (Episode 6)
 Kenji Sakamoto as Rock Shrimp, Starkey's assistant (Episode 6)
 Shinji Takeda as Takashi Nanao, a famous deaf pianist (Episode 7)
 Kang Ji-young as Yuka Nanase, Nanao's assistant (Episode 7)
 Minosuke as Kuniharu Yasuhara, Nanao's manager (Episode 7)
 Ryōsei Konishi as Yuta Yaotome, a superstar idol (Episode 8)
 Manami Miyaji as Yumi Kawai, Yaotome's manager, later as Yaotome's wife (Episode 8)
 Shinobu Nakayama as Emi Kujō, a surgeon's wife at Keirin University Hospital (Episode 9)
 Toshihiro Yashiba as Taisuke Kujō, a surgeon at Keirin University Hospital and also Emi's husband (Episode 9)
 Jirō Dan as Haruo Samejima, a director of Keirin University Hospital (Episode 9)
 Hitomi Takahashi as Ritsuko Samejima, Haruo's wife (Episode 9)
 Kōji Yano as Wang Chau, a businessman and founder of Wang International Clinic (Episode 10–11)
 Shunsaku Kudō as Goto, Wang's translator (Episode 10–11)
 Meisa Kuroki as Tokiko, Wang's wife (Episode 10)
 Charles Glover as Leonard Scoope, a presidential candidate (Episode 11)
 Jenny Skidmore as Diana, Scoope's wife (Episode 11)
 Daimaou Kosaka as a delivery package courier (Episode 11)

Season five 

 Kazuyuki Matsuzawa as Kazuhisa Kurumada, a bus driver (Episode 1)
 Yoshikazu Ebisu as himself (Episode 1)
 Takashi Masu as Tatsuo Isshiki, a medical journalist who having affair with Madoka Shimura (Episode 1)
 Blake Crawford as Jichael Mackson, a surgeon from Boston University (Episode 1)
 Mariko Akama as Isshiki's wife (Episode 1)
 Yoshiko Nakada as Fujiko, Ito's mother (Episode 2)
 Mitsuru Hirata as Kotobuki Mikamo, a pricinpal of Totei University Kindergarten (Episode 3)
 Eishi Ōfuji as Kenta, a Totei University Kindergarten student (Episode 3)
 Yuira Gotō as Mei, a Totei University Kindergarten student (Episode 3)
 Kōdai Matsumoto as Tsubasa, a Totei University Kindergarten student (Episode 3)
 Riisa Naka as Shiori Uchikanda (Episode 4)
 Shōtarō Mamiya as Goro Gotanda, a famous shogi player (Episode 5)
 Sei Hiraizumi as Yoshio Mutsuura, a Mikawaya gyoza restaurant owner (Episode 6)
 Yoneko Matsukane as Atsuko Mutsuura, Yoshio's wife (Episode 6)
 Hiroki Konno as Shingo Urita, an anesthesiologist (Episode 6)
 Hajime Tsukumo as Tamaki, a politician who operated by Inomata (Episode 6)
 Charlotte Kate Fox as Natasha Natinsky, a former surgeon and Hara's ex-girlfriend (Episode 7)
 Naho Toda as Sayuri Uchikanda, Kagenobu Uchikanda's wife (Episode 7)
 Kiyoe Koiizuka as Nanaka, Uchikanda's cousin (Episode 7)
 Shōzō Hayashiya as Takuya Yakumo, a former secretary of Minister of Health, Labour and Welfare (Episode 8)
 Ayaka Imoto as Haruka Kokonoe, a ballet dancer student (Episode 9)
 Sachie Hara as Hisako Kokonoe, Haruka's mother (Episode 9)
 Kōhei Ōtomo as Setsurō Kokonoe, Haruka's grandfather and Hisako's father (Episode 9)
 Kitaro as Kimoto, an orthopedic surgeon (Episode 9)
 Hidekazu Nagae as a prosecutor who arrested Uchikanda (Episode 10)
 Saki Seto as a prosecutor who arrested Hiruma (Episode 10)

Season six 

 Masachika Ichimura as Nicholas Tange, a wealthy investor who was hired to restructure Totei University Hospital (Episode 1 - 10)
 Shinji Takeda as Yu Samejima, Tange right-hand man (Episode 1 -10)
 Mio Imada as Nurse Masako Oma (Episode 5-10)
 Yusuke Itagaki as Kimihiko Ōyama, a special prosecutor (Episode 1, 7 ,9)
 Moro Morooka as Toshirō Nisshiki, an CEO of Nisshiki Group (Episode 2)
 Moka Kamishiraishi as Yuri Nisshiki, Toshirō's daughter and Furusawa's girlfriend who later as his wife (Episode 2)
 Shō Kiyohara as Kenji Furusawa, a domino expert and Yuri's boyfriend who later as her husband (Episode 2)
 Reiko Kataoka as Miyako Nisshiki, Toshirō's wife (Episode 2)
 Takuzō Kadono as Saburō Umezawa, a politician (Episode 3)
 Aki Nishihara as Kuniko Takeda, Umezawa's secretary and Hiruma's ex-lawyer (Episode 3)
 Shinichi Hatori as Customer T, a Monjaemon restaurant customer (Episode 3)
 Tooru Tamakawa as Customer H, a Monjaemon restaurant customer (Episode 3)
 Mitsuko Baisho as Yoshino, Ushio's mother (Episode 4)
 Kenshi Okada as Kiyoaki Yokkaichi, a world-renowned skater (Episode 4)
 Shima Iwashita as Masae Mihara, a chief of Japan Nurses Federation (Episode 5)
 Kenji Anan as Goro Mihara, Masae's son (Episode 5)
 Mayuko Saigō as Chiaki Mihara, Masae's granddaughter (Episode 5)
 Gaku Oshida and Shieri Ohata as the naughty couple (Episode 5)
 Hikakin as himself (Episode 5)
 Yuni Akino as Megumi, a nurse at Nurse Station bar (Episode 5)
 Umino Kawamura as Rika a nurse at Nurse Station bar (Episode 5)
 Riku Toida as Shinnosuke Mihara, Masae's great grandson (Episode 5)
 Yūta Hiraoka as Shōta Rokkakubashi, a director of Hexagon Bridge and a billionaire (Episode 6)
 Kahomi Takarabe as Mutsumi Minadzuki (Episode 6)
 Eriko Kimura as Mutsumi's mother (Episode 6)
 Alan Lowe as Seven Goldberg, a world banker (Episode 7)
 Ananda Jacobs as Natalie Goldberg, Seven's wife (Episode 7)
 Marika Matsumoto as Maria Nakayama, a surgeon at Totei University Hospital and later Hachimura's wife (Episode 8)
 Terunosuke Takezai as Masayoshi Hachimura, a politician who will be next prime minister and later Nakayama's husband (Episode 8)
 Ryudo Uzaki as Yuji Kudō, a famous rockstar (Episode 9)
 Mariko Tsutsui as Kyoko Kudō, Yuji's wife (Episode 9)
 Enon Kawatani as Takuya Niitsu, a singer-songwriter (Episode 9)
 Kairi Jō as Kazuto Yoshiyuki, a child pianist (Episode 9–10)

Season seven 
Ai Tominaga as Yuka Hitotsubashi, a member of House of Councillors (Episode 1)
Masaki Okada as Kei Ichiki (Episode 1)
Mio Imada as Nurse Masako Oma (Episode 1 - 10)
Yui Natsukawa as Mayako Niki (Episode 2)
Ichirota Miyakawa as Yashiro Kanbe, the Vice Minister of Health, Labor and Walfare (Episode 3, 8)
Maiko Kawakami as Kumiko Kanbe, Yashiro's wife who later divorced (Episode 3)
Kaname Ouki as Yuika Shiki, a musical actress (Episode 4)
Reina Sumi as Kaede Hayami, Shiki's rival (Episode 4)
Taira Imata as Shunichirō Ōkawa, a member of House of Representatives who having affair with Kaede (Episode 4)
Nao Matsushita as Akari Nasuda (Nurse X), a freelance nurse (Episode 5)
Hajime Inoue as Kazuo Itsuki, a rectal cancer patient (Episode 5)
Yōko Kondo as Yōko Itsuki, Kazuo's wife (Episode 5)
Hayato Yoshida as Oh Miroku, a Chinese IT president's son (Episode 6)
Toshie Negishi as Yasue Shichimiya, owner of (Episode 7)
Ito Iraishi as Moeka Shichimiya, Yasue's daughter (Episode 7)
Satoshi Tokushige as Sōshichi Enomoto, the Minister of the Environment (Episode 7)
Yō Takahashi as Taichi Mukaishima, Sōshichi's secretary (Episode 7)

Asaka Seto as Satsuki Yagami, Hiromi Jonouchi's high school classmate (Episode 8)
Gennosuke as Yuki Yagami, Satsuki's only son (Episode 8)
Kazuki Kosakai as a sushi restaurant chef (Episode 9–10)
Mansour Diagne as Dr. Shelp, the director of Institute of Infectious Diseases from Safiristan (Episode 9–10)
Igor T. as Julius, Dr. Shelp's attendant who died after being infected (Episode 9–10)
Cookie as Masayoshi Kabutogawa, a construction consultant president (Episode 10)
Hisako Manda as Katsuko Minami, governor of Tokyo (Episode 10)

Broadcast history 
Doctor-X'''s first season aired from October 18 to December 13, 2012, on Thursdays on TV Asahi in Japan.  It frequently was one of the top ranked dramas on private television in its time slot.

 Season one 
Premiering in 2012, the first season had 8 episodes and averaged a viewer share of  19.1%.  The final episode of the season was 15 minutes longer than other episodes.

 Season two 
The second season aired in 2013, and included 9 episodes which averaged a viewer share of 23.0%.

 Season three 
The third season aired in 2014.

 Special 
The two-hour special followed the third season, airing in July 2016.
Daimon is in Kanazawa, with action centering around the country's vanguard hospital for drug testing Cross Medical Center serving as the hospital backdrop. National politician Aiko Ichinose, played by Kayako Kishimoto, collapses on the street following an intimate interlude. Daimon finds him on the street, and sees to his transport to the Cross Medical Center.  She then immediately operates on the politician after getting him there. Meanwhile, reigning world figure skating champion Kojiro Himuro, played by guest star Hey! Say! JUMP group member Kei Inoo, is suffering from chronic thromboembolic pulmonary hypertension ahead of the upcoming world championships. Medical Center of the Cross director Kantaro Kurosu asks Daimon Michiko to perform the surgery.

 Season four Doctor-X continued to run on Thursday nights in the 9:00 PM time slot on TV Asahi. The fourth season contained 11 episodes and aired in late 2016.  It finished with an average market share of 21.5%.

The maximum viewing share during the season was the last episode, during a scene featuring 43-year-old Japanese comedian Daimaou Kosaka.  It finished top in the rankings among Japanese dramas in 2016. It was the top ranked show for the first half of its run in the fourth season.  The final episode of the season had a market share of 22.8%.  The third episode had the highest market share for the season at 24.3%.  The fourth episode had a rating of 21.3%.  Among viewers who saved the show to watch later, the show ranked third in October 2016.

The airing of the third episode was slightly delayed as a result of a live program about the bombing of Hiroshima.

 Season five 
The fifth season aired Japan in late 2017.

After five episodes, the show was averaging 20.1% market share and was the top ranked drama on private television networks.

 Season six 

Ratings

 Production team 
Miho Nakazomo was the main writer for the first season. She had experience writing dramas with her 10 years of work on "Woman's woman ~ Tax collector inspector" and on the original story she wrote called "Haken no Rika".

 Awards 
Ryoko Yonekura was awarded best actress at the 21st Hashida Awards for her performance as Doctor-X.  It was her second time winning the award, previously winning it for her performance in the second season.  Yonekura was also recognized with the Kuniko Mukda prize in 2013.

Miho Nakazomo co-won the best writer award at the 21st Hashida Awards, sharing the honor with Kobayashi Nenjyutsu.

 Spinoffs Doctor-X: Surgeon Michiko Daimon was spun off with the show Doctor-Y: Surgeon Hideki Kaji, featuring Masanobu Katsumura playing Hideki Kaji.
It started airing on September 29, 2016. Katsumura was surprised and pleased that his character was spun off and he became the lead of the new series.

 Distribution Doctor-X: Surgeon Michiko Daimon is distributed internationally via Netflix and Amazon Prime in selected countries with English language subtitles. In India, Doctor-X'' is dubbed in Hindi language on the occasion of International Women's Day and it is as of 2018 streaming on Indian Digital Platform ZEE5 for Season 1 and 2 only. It's not available anymore in the app. However, all six seasons are now available in India through the Netflix streaming service. Japan Foundation also distributed the first seasons in some Latin American countries (Mexico, Guatemala, El Salvador and Bolivia) in 2017, dubbed in Spanish.

In Southeast Asia, WakuWaku Japan aired all six seasons of the series with subtitles, and is scheduled to air the seventh season on a near-simulcast basis starting in October 2021.

References

2012 Japanese television series debuts
2012 in Japanese television
Japanese drama television series
TV Asahi television dramas
Television shows written by Miho Nakazono